Muhammed Fethullah Gülen (born 27 April 1941) is a Turkish Islamic scholar, preacher, and a one-time opinion leader, as de facto leader of the Gülen movement. Gülen is designated an influential neo-Ottomanist, Anatolian panethnicist, Islamic poet, writer, social critic, and activist–dissident developing a Nursian theological perspective that embraces democratic modernity. Gülen was a local state imam from 1959 to 1981, and he was a citizen of Turkey until his 2017 denaturalization by the government. Over the years, Gülen became a centrist political figure in Turkey prior to his being there as a fugitive. Since 1999, Gülen has lived in self-exile in the United States near Saylorsburg, Pennsylvania.

Gülen says his social criticisms are focused upon individuals' faith and morality and a lesser extent toward political ends and self describes as rejecting an Islamist political philosophy, advocating instead for full participation within professions, society, and political life by religious and secular individuals who profess high moral or ethical principles and who wholly support secular rule, within Muslim-majority countries and elsewhere. Gülen founded the Gülen movement (known as the hizmet, meaning "service" in Turkish), which is a 3-to-6 million strong, volunteer-based movement in Turkey and around the world. (All Hizmet's schools, foundations and other entities in Turkey have been closed by the Turkish government following the 2016 Turkish coup d'état attempt.) The movement promotes individual piety, ethical conduct, education, civil society, and religious tolerance, and social networks. These networks self-describe as originating spontaneously, their constituent local entities functioning independently from each other, existing, in the aggregate, as leaderless activist entities. "I really don't know 0.1% of the people in this movement", Gülen has said. "I haven't done much. I have just spoken out on what I believe. Because it [Gülen's teachings] made sense, people grasped it themselves." "I opened one school to see if people liked it. So they created more schools." The movement includes some theological staff as imams or spiritual counselors, although their identities are kept confidential due to such positions being illegal in Turkey. This has led some observers to argue that the movement includes a clandestine aspect.

Sharing Turkish President Recep Tayyip Erdoğan's ambition to empower religious individuals in civil life previously disenfranchised in secular Turkey, in 2003 a number of Gülen movement participants pivoted from the Turkish political center to become the junior partner with the newly ruling Erdoğan-led and center-right Justice and Development Party (AKP), providing the party political and sorely-needed administrative support. This political alliance worked together to weaken left-of-center Kemalist factions in the judiciary, military, and police (see Ergenekon trials). It internally fractured in 2011, which became common knowledge by the time of the corruption investigations of highly placed members of Turkey's ruling party in 2013. Turkish prosecutors accuse Gülen of attempts to overthrow the government by allegedly directing politically motivated corruption investigations by Gülen-linked investigators then in the judiciary, who illegally wiretapped the executive office of the Turkish president, and, with assistance perhaps from unnamed individuals in the American intelligence community, Gülen's alleged instigations or fomentations toward the 2016 coup attempt by factions within Turkish armed forces indeed including Gülenists. Gülen says he did not personally influence past prosecutions of Justice and Development Party members by judiciary prosecutors from assorted political factions and has said he has "stood against all coups". A Turkish criminal court has issued an arrest warrant for Gülen. Turkey is demanding the extradition of Gülen from the United States. U.S. government officials do not believe he is associated with any terrorist activity, and have requested evidence to be provided by the Turkish Government to substantiate the allegations in the warrant requesting extradition, frequently rejecting Turkish calls for his extradition.

In a February 2019 opinion piece, Gülen said, "[I]n Turkey, a vast arrest campaign based on guilt by association is ongoing. The number of victims of this campaign of persecution keeps increasing ... . Erdogan is draining the reputation that the Turkish Republic has gained in the international arena, pushing Turkey into the league of nations known for suffocating freedoms and jailing democratic dissenters. The ruling clique is exploiting diplomatic relations, mobilizing government personnel and resources to harass, haunt and abduct Hizmet movement volunteers all around the world." Gülen is actively involved in the societal debate concerning the future of the Turkish state, and Islam in the modern world. He has been described in the English-language media as an imam "who promotes a tolerant Islam which emphasises altruism, hard work and education" and as "one of the world's most important Muslim figures." Gülen is wanted as a terrorist leader in Turkey and Pakistan as well as by the governments of OIC and GCC.
Gülen is in the red category of the "most wanted terrorists list" published by the Ministry of Interior of the Republic of Turkey since October 28, 2015. The list contains information that Fethullah Gülen was born in Erzurum in 1941 and is a member of the Hizmet movement organization. The Ministry announced that a monetary reward of up to 10 million Turkish liras will be given to Gülen in this category.

Biography

Muhammed Fethullah Gülen was born in the village of Korucuk, near Erzurum, to Ramiz and Refia Gülen,  There is some confusion over his birth date.  Some accounts, usually older ones, give it as 10 November 1938, while others give 27 April 1941. Some commentators point to the 10 November 1938 date coinciding with the death of Mustafa Kemal Atatürk, who founded modern Turkey, and suggests that it was deliberately chosen for its political significance. An alternative explanation for the discrepancy offered by one of Gülen's close students, and biographer, was that his parents waited 3 years to register his birth. State documents support the 1941 date, and Gülen's English website now uses that; it is now the accepted date.

His father was an imam. His mother taught the Qur'an in their village, despite such informal religious instruction being banned by the Kemalist government. Gülen's secular formal education ended when his family moved to another village. He took part in Islamic education in some Erzurum madrasas and he gave his first sermon as a licensed state preacher in 1958, when he was in his teens. Gülen was influenced by the ideas of Kurdish scholar Said Nursî.

Gülen was in the Turkish civil service from his appointment as an assistant imam at Üç Şerefeli Mosque in Edirne, 6 August 1959, until he retired from formal preaching duties in 1981.

While Gülen was teaching at the Kestanepazari Qur'anic School in Izmir, the coup of 12 March 1971, occurred. During its aftermath, Gülen was arrested for organizing a clandestine religious group based on his teachings and was imprisoned for seven months.

From 1988 to 1991 he gave a series of sermons in popular mosques of major cities. In 1994, he participated in the founding of the Journalists and Writers Foundation and was given the title "honorary president" by the foundation. He did not make any comment regarding the closures of the Welfare Party in 1998 or the Virtue Party in 2001. He has met some politicians like Tansu Çiller and Bülent Ecevit, but he avoids meeting with the leaders of Islamic political parties.

In 1999, Gülen relocated to the United States for medical treatment. According to the Kemalist Turkish law of the time, intending to ensure modernity and secularism, non-state sanctioned religious endeavors were outlawed and Gülen could have anticipated being tried especially over remarks (aired after he immigrated to U.S.) which seemed to favor an Islamic state. In June 1999, after Gülen had left Turkey, videotapes were sent to some Turkish television stations with recordings of Gülen saying,

Gülen said his remarks were taken out of context, and his supporters raised questions about the authenticity of the tape, which he said had been "manipulated". Gülen was tried in absentia in 2000, and acquitted in 2008 under the new Justice and Development Party (AKP) government of Prime Minister Recep Tayyip Erdoğan.

Gülen applied for a green card in 2002. After 11 September 2001, the U.S. increased its scrutiny of its domestic Islamic religious groups. Objecting to Gulen's residency application were the FBI, the State Department, and the Department of Homeland Security. Gülen first based his claim to residency on his being as an alien of extraordinary ability as an education activist; the U.S. Citizenship and Immigration Services rejected it. Lawyers representing the Secretary of Homeland Security argued in that Gülen has no degree or training in the field of education and questioned laudatory opinions about Gülen, cited by his lawyers, that had been expressed by scholars at academics conferences funded by Gulenist foundations. CIA National Intelligence Council former vice chairman Graham E. Fuller, former CIA official George Fidas and former US Ambassador to Turkey Morton Abramowitz wrote endorsement letters for Gülen's green card application in 2008. The court ruled against the USCIS and in Gülen's favor, granting Gülen his green card.

With the advent of Erdoğanist Turkey in the 2000s, structural impediments to Muslims' participation in civil life were gradually lifted. Many of those educated in institutions sponsored by participants in civil-society endeavors that Gülen had inspired ended up as members of the Turkey's judiciary, its governmental apparatus, and its military. In the build-up of societal conflicts in the period just prior to the 2016 Turkish coup d'état attempt, Erdoğanism changed in its perception of Gülenism from that of sometimes ally to a dangerous rival, attempting to construct a parallel state structure. Before and after the attempted putsch, Gülenists became the greatest portion of those caught up in the massive 2016–present purges in Turkey. Since the 2016 coup attempt, authorities arrested or imprisoned more than 90,000 Turkish citizens.

On 19 December 2014, a Turkish court issued an arrest warrant for Gülen after over 20 journalists working for media outlets thought to be sympathetic to the Gülen movement were arrested. Gülen was accused of establishing and running an "armed terrorist group".

As of 2018, Gülen resides at the Hizmet movement-affiliated Chestnut Retreat Center, a 25-acre wooded estate in the Poconos (within Ross Township, Monroe County, Pennsylvania, near Saylorsburg). About thirty people live and work on the estate, owned by the Golden Generation Foundation. Never married, Gülen's own living quarters and study are within a pair of small rooms, whose rent he pays out of his publishing royalties and which contain a mattress on the floor, prayer mat, desk, bookshelves, and treadmill, within one of the estate's several structures, among which is a hall used as a mosque. Gülen is reported to be in ill health. In 2017, reports identified four candidates to succeed Gulen, if necessary, in leadership of the Hizmet movement: Mehmet Ali Şengül, Cevdet Türkyolu, Osman Şimşek and Ahmet Kurucan.

Influence in Turkish society and politics

The Gülen movement, also known as Hizmet ('Service') or Cemaat (pronounced Jamaat and meaning 'Community'), has millions of followers, as well as many more abroad. Beyond the schools established by Gülen's followers, many Gülenists held positions of power in Turkey's police forces and judiciary. Turkish and foreign analysts believe Gülen also has sympathizers in the Turkish parliament and that his movement controlled the widely read Islamic conservative Zaman newspaper, the private Bank Asya bank, the Samanyolu TV television station, and many other media and business organizations, including the Turkish Confederation of Businessmen and Industrialists (TUSKON). All have been shut down following the coup attempt. In March 2011, the Turkish government arrested the investigative journalist Ahmet Şık and seized and banned his book The Imam's Army, the culmination of Şık's investigation into Gülen and the Gülen movement.

Gülen taught a Hanafi version of Islam, deriving from Sunni Muslim scholar Said Nursî's teachings. Gülen has stated that he believes in science, interfaith dialogue among the People of the Book, and multi-party democracy. He has initiated such dialogue with the Vatican and some Jewish organizations.

1970s, 1980s and 1990s
Gülen opened an ışık evler or "light houses" (students' hostel offering scholarships for poorer scholars) in 1976, with there being informal sohbets (Quranic discussions) available there for the students as well. Gülen encouraged like-minded individuals to follow suit, which became the genesis of the Gülen movement.

During the political violence in Turkey between the right and left in the 1970s, Gülen "invited people to practice tolerance and forgiveness." Following the 1980 Turkish coup d'état, in which the military targeted communists, Gülen gave his "explicit assent" to the coup, saying:

Following the political violence of the preceding years, Gülen expected that the coup would reestablish stability and lead to a subsequent restoration of democracy. Gülen's assent to the coup later prompted criticism from Turkish liberals.

Despite Gülen's support for the coup, the military authorities issued an arrest warrant against him, which was revoked by a "state security court" in 1986.

In the 1980s and 1990s under Turgut Özal, Gülen and his movement benefited from social and political reforms, managing "to turn his traditional and geographically confined faith movement into a nationwide educational and cultural phenomenon" that "attempted to bring 'religious' perspectives into the public sphere on social and cultural issues." The growth of the Gülen movement sparked opposition from both Kemalists, who perceived the movement as threatening to undermine secularism, and from more radical Islamists who viewed the movement as "accommodating" and "pro-American".

Ergenekon Trials

In 2005, a man affiliated with the Gülen movement approached U.S. Ambassador to Turkey Eric S. Edelman during a party in Istanbul and handed him an envelope containing a document supposedly detailing plans for an imminent coup against the government by the Turkish military. However, the documents were soon found to be forgeries. Gülen affiliates state that the movement is "civic" in nature and that it does not have political aspirations. However, he was accused of being the mastermind behind the Ergenekon trials by secularists, who see the trial's objective as weakening of Turkish military. Those who publicly said that the trial was a sham were subject to harassment by Zaman, some examples being Dani Rodrik and İlhan Cihaner.

Split with Erdoğan

Despite Gülen's and his followers' statements that the organization is non-political in nature, analysts believed that a number of corruption-related arrests made against allies of Erdoğan reflect a growing political power struggle between Gülen and Erdoğan. These arrests led to the 2013 corruption scandal in Turkey, which the ruling Justice and Development Party (AKP)'s supporters (along with Erdoğan himself) and the opposition parties alike have said were choreographed by Gülen after Erdoğan's government came to the decision early in December 2013 to shut down many of his movement's private pre-university schools in Turkey.

The Erdoğan government has said that the corruption investigation and comments by Gülen are the long term political agenda of Gülen's movement to infiltrate security, intelligence, and justice institutions of the Turkish state, a charge almost identical to the charges against Gülen by the Chief Prosecutor of Turkey in his trial in 2000 before Erdoğan's party had come into power. Gülen had previously been tried in absentia in 2000, and acquitted of these charges in 2008 under Erdoğan's AKP government.

In emailed comments to the Wall Street Journal in January 2014, Gülen said that "Turkish people ... are upset that in the last two years democratic progress is now being reversed", but he denied being part of a plot to unseat the government. Later, in January 2014 in an interview with BBC World, Gülen said "If I were to say anything to people I may say people should vote for those who are respectful to democracy, rule of law, who get on well with people. Telling or encouraging people to vote for a party would be an insult to peoples' intellect. Everybody very clearly sees what is going on."

According to some commentators, Gülen is to Erdoğan what Trotsky was to Stalin. Ben Cohen of the Jewish News Syndicate wrote: "Rather like Leon Trotsky, the founder of the Soviet Red Army who was hounded and chased out of the USSR by Joseph Stalin, Gülen has become an all-encompassing explanation for the existential threats, as Erdogan perceives them, that are currently plaguing Turkey. Stalin saw the influence of 'Trotskyite counter-revolutionaries' everywhere, and brutally purged every element of the Soviet apparatus. Erdogan is now doing much the same with the 'Gülenist terrorists.

Extradition request, U.S.–Turkey tensions

Shortly after the botched coup attempt of 15 July 2016, the Turkish government stated that the coup attempt had been organized by Gülen and/or his movement. Turkish prime minister Binali Yıldırım in late July 2016 told The Guardian: "Of course, since the leader of this terrorist organisation is residing in the United States, there are question marks in the minds of the people whether there is any U.S. involvement or backing. So America from this point on should really think how they will continue to cooperate with Turkey, which is a strategic ally for them in the region and world." Gülen, who denied any involvement in the coup attempt and denounced it, has in turn accused Erdoğan of "turning a failed putsch into a slow-motion coup of his own against constitutional government."

On 19 July, an official request had been sent to the U.S. for the extradition of Fethullah Gülen. On 23 July 2016, Turkey formally submitted a formal extradition request accompanied by certain documents as supporting evidence. Senior U.S. officials said this evidence pertained to certain pre-coup alleged subversive activities.

On 19 September, Turkish government officials met with retired US Army Lt. General Mike Flynn, former CIA Director James Woolsey, and others to discuss legal and potentially illegal ways such as enforced disappearance for removing Gülen from the US. In March 2017, Flynn registered as a foreign agent for his 2016 lobbying work on behalf of the government of Turkey.

Rudy Giuliani privately urged Donald Trump in 2017 to extradite Gülen.

In addition, the Turkish government reportedly sought to pressure a number of foreign governments into shutting down schools and medical facilities allegedly associated with the Gülen movement including in Pakistan, Somalia, Germany, Indonesia, Nigeria and Kenya. In Somalia, two large schools and a hospital linked to the movement have been shut down following a request by the Turkish administration. Albania and Bosnia have also seen requests by Turkey to close or investigate Gülen-linked schools.

Egypt asylum proposal 

In Egypt, MP Emad Mahrous called on the Egyptian government to grant asylum to Gülen. In the request, sent to Speaker of the House of Representatives Ali Abdel-Aal, Prime Minister Sherif Ismail and Foreign Minister Sameh Shoukry on 24 July 2016, Mahrous notes that "[Turkey] was a moderate Muslim country that has become an Islamist dictatorship at the hands of [Turkish president] Recep Tayyip Erdoğan and his affiliated Muslim Brotherhood political party", arguing that it was highly distasteful that Erdoğan has requested Gülen's extradition from the United States while at the same time "giving shelter to hundreds of leaders of the Muslim Brotherhood terrorist organisation and members of other bloody militant Islamist groups which attack Egypt by day and night."

Mahrous argues that Erdoğan has not only accused Gülen of plotting the failed coup attempt, but also used this allegation as an excuse to engage in mass purges against public institutions allegedly loyal to Gülen—"but at the same time Erdoğan has decided to turn Turkey into a media battleground against Egypt, with Turkish intelligence providing funds for several Muslim Brotherhood TV channels to attack Egypt". Mahrous stated that his advice to Gülen is to not wait until his extradition, but instead leave the United States and obtain permanent asylum in Egypt. Former Egyptian President Anwar Sadat granted asylum to Shah Mohammad Reza Pahlavi following his arrival in Egypt from the US, regardless of the threats that were issued by Iran's ayatollahs during the Iranian Revolution.

Continuing aftermath 
In March 2017, former CIA Director James Woolsey told the Wall Street Journal that he had been at a 19 September 2016 meeting with then Trump campaign advisor Mike Flynn with Turkey's foreign minister, Mevlüt Çavuşoğlu, and energy minister, Berat Albayrak, where the possibility of Gulen's abduction and forced rendition to Turkey was discussed. Although no concrete kidnapping plan was discussed, Woolsey left the meeting, concerned that a general discussion about "a covert step in the dead of night to whisk this guy away" might be construed as illegal under American law. A spokesman for Flynn denied Woolsey's account, telling Business Insider that no nonjudicial removal had been discussed at the meeting.

In July 2017, one year after the anti-Erdoğan putsch, Gülen wrote: "Accusations against me related to the coup attempt are baseless, politically motivated slanders." In the 1990s, Gulen had been issued a special Turkish passport as a retired holder of the religious post, in the Turkish state religion of Sunni Islam, of mufti; in 2017 this passport was revoked. Unless Gulen travels to Turkey by the end of September 2017, he will be stateless. On 26 September 2017, Gulen asked for a United Nations commission to investigate the 2016 coup attempt.

Also, Gulen said in an interview with NPR: "To this day, I have stood against all coups. My respect for the military aside, I have always been against interventions. ... If any one among those soldiers had called me and told me of their plan, I would tell them, 'You are committing murder.' ... If they ask me what my final wish is, I would say the person [Erdogan] who caused all this suffering and oppressed thousands of innocents, I want to spit in his face."

On 28 September 2017, Erdoğan requested the U.S. to extradite Gülen in exchange for American pastor Andrew Brunson, under arrest in Turkey on charges related to Brunson's alleged affiliation with "FETO" (the Gulen movement); Erdoğan said, "You have a pastor too. Give him to us. ... Then we will try [Brunson] and give him to you". "You have a pastor too. ... You give us that one and we'll work with our judiciary and give back yours." The Federal judiciary alone determines extradition cases in the U.S. An August 2017 decree gave Erdogan authority to approve the exchange of detained or convicted foreigners with people held in other countries. Asked about the suggested swap on 28 September 2017, U.S. State Department spokeswoman Heather Nauert said: "I can't imagine that we would go down that road. ... We have received extradition requests for him [Gulen]." Anonymous US officials have said to reporters that the Turkish government has not yet provided sufficient evidence for the U.S. Justice Department to charge Gulen.

As of September 2017, what Turkey had provided the U.S. was information about Gulen dating to before the 2016 coup attempt and Turkey was in the process of compiling information allegedly linking Gulen to the coup attempt.

In 2017, Amnesty International and Human Rights Watch separately issued statements urging governments to avoid extraditions to Turkey.

In November 2018, the Trump administration asked the U.S. Justice Department to explore what legal justifications could be used, should it decide to seek for Gulen to be deported. On 17 December 2018, the US Department of Justice announced the indictment of two men, alleging that they acted "in the United States as illegal agents of the Government of Turkey" and conspired "to covertly influence U.S. politicians and public opinion against" Fetullah Gulen. The two men, former associates of ex-US national security adviser Michael Flynn, used the now-dissolved Flynn Intel Group in an effort to discredit Gulen dating back to July 2016, according to the indictment.

In 2022, U.S. Senate candidate for Pennsylvania Dr. Mehmet Oz predicted (to the Washington Post), "Gulen cannot be touched. There are no credible allegations that he was involved in the coup. He will stay in Pennsylvania."

Thought and activism

Initiatives

The Gülen movement is a transnational Islamic civic society movement inspired by Gülen's teachings. His teachings about hizmet (altruistic service to the common good) have attracted a large number of supporters in Turkey, Central Asia, and increasingly in other parts of the world.

Education
In his sermons, Gülen has reportedly stated: "Studying physics, mathematics, and chemistry is worshipping God." With regard to terrorism, Gülen believes "The antidote is a religious education program that teaches the tradition in a holistic and contextualized way. To be able to resist the deceits of radical ideologues, young Muslims must understand the spirit of their scripture and the overarching principles of their Prophet's life".

Gülen's followers have built over 1,000 schools around the world. In Turkey, Gülen's schools are considered among the best: expensive modern facilities where the English language is taught from the first grade. However, former teachers from outside the Gülen community have called into question the treatment of women and girls in Gülen schools, reporting that female teachers were excluded from administrative responsibilities, allowed little autonomy, and—along with girls from the sixth grade and up—segregated from male colleagues and pupils during break and lunch periods.

Interfaith and intercultural dialogue

During the 1990s, he began to advocate interreligious tolerance and dialogue. He has personally met with leaders of other religions, including Pope John Paul II, the Ecumenical Patriarch Bartholomew I of Constantinople, and Israeli Sephardic Chief Rabbi Eliyahu Bakshi-Doron.

Gülen has said that he favors cooperation between followers of different religions as well as religious and secular elements within society. Among his strongest supporters and collaborators has been for years the Greek Orthodox Turcologist and professor at the University of Ottawa, Dimitri Kitsikis.

Gülen has shown sympathy towards certain demands of Turkey's Alevi minority, such as recognising their cemevis as official places of worship and supporting better Sunni-Alevi relations; stating Alevis "definitely enrich Turkish culture".

Political views

Theology 
Gülen does not advocate a new theology but refers to classical authorities of theology, taking up their line of argument. His understanding of Islam tends to be moderate and mainstream. Though he has never been a member of a Sufi tarekat and does not see tarekat membership as a necessity for Muslims, he teaches that "Sufism is the inner dimension of Islam" and "the inner and outer dimensions must never be separated."

He teaches that the Muslim community has a duty of service (Turkish: hizmet) to the common good of the community and the nation and to Muslims and non-Muslims all over the world; and that the Muslim community is obliged to conduct dialogue with not just the "People of the Book" (Jews and Christians), and people of other religions, but also with agnostics and atheists.

Gülen's Sufism is greatly influenced by Sufi Kurdish Quranic scholar Said Nursi (1877–1960), who advocated illuminating modern education and science through Islam. Gülen expands on Nursi to advocate what has been described as a "Turkish nationalist, state-centered and pro-business approach" centered on service (hizmet, in Turkish). Some participants within Gülen's movement have viewed Nursi's or Gülen's works as that of mujaddids or "renewers" of Islam within their respective times. Others have opined in more eschatological terms, equating Gülen's work as assistance toward the prophesied Mahdi to come, albeit Gülen's spokespersons discourage broaching such speculation. and an official gülenist website hosts an article entitled "Claiming to be the Mahdi is Deviation". In 2016, Turkey's Religious Affairs Directorate (Diyanet), Mehmet Görmez, said Gülen's is a "fake Mahdi movement".

Anatolian nationalism; Turkish Islam
Gülen defines Turkish nationalism by particular type of Anatolian Muslim culture that is at the roots of the modern Turkish nation state, rather than by any specific ethnicity. He believes Turkish Islam (meaning "Sufism") an especially legitimate, if not an exclusively valid expression of the Islamic faith, especially with concern individuals of a Turkish background. Albeit Gülen ascribes positive characteristics to various localized entities, overall the tenor of Gülen's teachings warn against the human tendencies toward insularity or discriminations against people of other ethnicities, other branches of Islam, or other faiths.

Kurdish issues 
He was accused of being against the peace process which had aimed to resolve the long-running Kurdish-Turkish conflict. However, Gülen's supporters dismiss this claim, citing his work with many Kurds.

Freedom of expression
Excerpt from Gülen-penned op-ed in The New York Times:

Secularism
Gülen has criticized secularism in Turkey as "reductionist materialism". However, he has in the past said that a secular approach that is "not anti-religious" and "allows for freedom of religion and belief, is compatible with Islam."

According to one Gülen press release, in democratic-secular countries, 95% of Islamic principles are permissible and practically feasible, and there is no problem with them. The remaining 5% "are not worth fighting for".

Turkish bid to join the EU 

Gülen has supported Turkey's bid to join the European Union and has said that neither Turkey nor the EU have anything to fear, but have much to gain, from a future of full Turkish membership in the EU.

Women's roles
According to Aras and Caha, Gülen's views on women are "progressive". Gülen says the coming of Islam saved women, who "were absolutely not confined to their home and ... never oppressed" in the early years of the religion. He feels that extreme feminism, however, is "doomed to imbalance like all other reactionary movements" and eventually "being full of hatred towards men".

Terrorism
Gülen has condemned terrorism. He warns against the phenomenon of arbitrary violence and aggression against civilians and said that it "has no place in Islam". He wrote a condemnation article in The Washington Post on 12 September 2001, one day after the September 11 attacks, and stated that "A Muslim can not be a terrorist, nor can a terrorist be a true Muslim." Gülen lamented the "hijacking of Islam" by terrorists.

Gaza flotilla
Gülen criticized the Turkish-led Gaza flotilla for trying to deliver aid without Israel's consent to Palestinians in Gaza. He spoke of watching the news coverage of the deadly confrontation between Israeli commandos and multinational aid group members as its flotilla approached Israel's sea blockade of Gaza. He said, "What I saw was not pretty, it was ugly." He has since continued his criticism, saying later that the organizers' failure to seek accord with Israel before attempting to deliver aid was "a sign of defying authority, and will not lead to fruitful matters."

Syrian Civil War
Gülen is strongly against Turkish involvement in the Syrian Civil War. While rejecting the Turkish government's desire to topple the Syrian government of President Bashar al-Assad, Gülen supports military intervention against ISIL.

Armenian genocide 

Addressing the Armenian genocide in a 6 May 1965 letter, Gülen wrote: "I have known Armenian families and individuals during my childhood and working positions. I will not stop cursing the Great Genocide committed against Armenians in 1915. I know that among the people killed and massacred were many highly respected individuals, for whose memory I bow with respect. I curse with great grief the massacre of the sons of the Great Prophet Christ by ignorant individuals who call themselves Muslims."

Publications
Gülen's official website lists 44 publications by him; these are, however, more akin to essays and collections of sermons than books on specific subjects with a specific thesis. He is also said to have authored many articles on a variety of topics: social, political and religious issues, art, science and sports, and recorded thousands of audio and video cassettes. He writes the lead article for The Fountain, Yeni Ümit, Sızıntı, and Yağmur Islamic philosophical magazines. Several of his books have been translated into English.

The Messenger of God: Muhammad, Tughra Books, 2nd edition, 2008. 
Reflections on the Qur'an: Commentaries on Selected Verses, Tughra Books, 2012. 
Toward Global Civilization Love and Tolerance, Tughra Books, 2010.
From Seed to Cedar: Nurturing the Spiritual Needs in Children, Tughra Books, 2013. 	 
Terror and Suicide Attacks: An Islamic Perspective, Tughra Books, 2008. 	 
Journey to Noble Ideals: Droplets of Wisdom from the Heart (Broken Jug), Tughra Books, 2014. 	 
Speech and Power of Expression, Tughra Books, 2010. 	 
Selected Prayers of Prophet Muhammad, Tughra Books, 2012.

Reception
Martin Luther King Jr. International Chapel at Morehouse College awarded its 2015 Gandhi King Ikeda Peace Award to Gülen in recognition of his lifelong dedication to promoting peace and human rights.
 
Gülen topped the 2008 Top 100 Public Intellectuals Poll and came out as the most influential thinker.

Gülen was named as one of Time magazine's 100 Most Influential People in 2013.

In 2015, Oklahoma City Thunder basketball player Enes Kanter said that he was excluded from the Turkish national basketball team for his public support of Gülen. Kanter was disowned by his family in 2016 due to his support for Gülen.

Gülen was listed as one of the 500 most influential Muslims by the Royal Islamic Strategic Studies Centre in Amman, Jordan.

Gülen was listed on the Watkins' Spiritual 100 List for 2019 as one of the "100 Most Spiritually Influential Living People".

Rise Up (Colors of Peace) album

Rise Up (Colors of Peace) was a musical project to turn Gülen's poems and writings in Turkish language into songs. A total of 50 poems were sent to various Muslim and non-Muslim artists from various countries, who were free to pick, and then compose and vocalize the poem chosen, record it in their own country and send it back for inclusion in the planned album. Reportedly, no restrictions were put on the artists in using instrumentation, despite reservations by stricter Muslim interpretations about music and use of musical instruments. The album Rise Up (Colors of Peace) turned into an album of world music encompassing various genres like jazz, pop, flamenco, rai, Indian music among others. The artists appearing (in order of appearance on the track list) were: The Good Morning Diary, Maher Zain, Faudel, Cristelo Duo featuring Bruno Gouveia, Ryan Shaw, Natacha Atlas, Bon Bon, KK & Reet, Mazachigno featuring Ely Bruna, Bahroma, Carmen Paris, Kobi Farhi & Ruba Shamshoum. The project took more than two years to realize and the album was released in 2013 by Nil Production and Universal Music.

Further reading

Notes

References
Specific citations:

General references:

Interfaith Radio – Turkey's Champion of Interfaith Dialogue
The Economist – Global Muslim networks- How far they have travelled
The Economist - Fethullah Gulen- A farm boy on the world stage
Reuters – Turkish Islamic preacher – threat or benefactor?
The New York Times – Turkish Schools Offer Pakistan a Gentler Vision of Islam
The New York Times: Fethullah Gulen profile
Foreign Policy – Fethullah Gulen as a Top Public Intellectual
Profile on PBS show: Religion and Ethics January 21, 2011
The New Republic: The Global Imam
Qantara.de: The Fethullah Gülen Movement: Pillar of Society or Threat to Democracy?
MERIA: Fethullah Gülen and his Liberal "Turkish Islam" movement
ME Forum: Turkish Islam's Moderate Face
ME Forum: Fethullah Gülen's Grand Ambition: Turkey's Islamist Danger
The Gülen Movement: a modern expression of Turkish Islam
The Nurcu Movement in Kazakhstan and Kyrgyzstan

External links

 
 Fethullah Gulen
 Hizment and Fethullah Gulen
 Love is a Verb  (2014), a film directed by Terry Spencer Hesser
 
 
 IMDb 
 Who Is Fethullah Gülen?
   
 Multi-media
 
 

1941 births
Living people
People from Pasinler

Turkish Sufis
Turkish anti-communists
Turkish dissidents
Turkish exiles
Turkish scholars of Islam
Turkish emigrants to the United States
Turkish male writers
Sunni Muslim scholars of Islam
Christian–Islamic–Jewish interfaith dialogue
Critics of atheism
Islam and politics
Scholars of Sufism
Stateless people
Quranic exegesis scholars
Fugitives wanted on terrorism charges
Fugitives wanted by Turkey
People involved in the 2016 Turkish coup d'état attempt
20th-century Muslim scholars of Islam
21st-century Muslim scholars of Islam
20th-century Turkish male writers
21st-century Turkish male writers